Perry High School is a public high school located in Gilbert, Arizona and the 4th high school built by Chandler Unified School District (CUSD).

History 
The school's design was based on the layout of Basha High School, another school in the Chandler Unified School District, with an additional "F" building built exclusively for Career and Technical Education (CTE) classes in the same place as the "H" building in Basha High School. As of 2019, construction is underway for a similar expansion on the east side of the campus.

Academics 
Perry abides by the standards set by the Arizona Department of Education and implements the state's Education and Career Action Plan (ECAP) required for all 9-12 grade students to graduate from a public Arizona high school. CUSD high schools also implements an open enrollment policy, meaning students from outside the intended school boundaries may attend without tuition or other penalties.

Arizona requires that all high school students take 6 credit bearing courses during their freshmen through junior years, and have the option of reducing credits to 4 credit bearing courses if they are track for graduation. However, CUSD requires all students must complete 22 credits whereas the public university system controlled by the Arizona Board of Regents requires only 16 credits in the following areas:
 English - 4 credits
 Mathematics - 4 credits
 Science - 3 credits
 Social Studies. - 3 credits
 Career and Technical Educator/Fine Arts - 1 credit
 Physical Education - 1 credit
 Comprehensive Health - ½ credits
 Elective Courses - 5 ½ credits

Cross-credit courses 
At Perry and all CUSD high school students may swap three semesters (½ credits per semester) of Spiritline, Beginning through Advance Dance, Drill Team, Color Guard, Marching Band, Winter guard, or AFJROTC essentially waiving the required one Physical Education credit required for graduation.

Students which choose applied sciences in areas such as Applied Biology or Applied Agricultural Sciences gain equivalent Science credits. Likewise, Economics credits can be awarded like Agricultural Business Management, Business, Business Applications, Marketing, Economics Applications, Family and Consumer Sciences, and vocational courses.

Community college credits can be awarded through a partnership with Chandler-Gilbert Community College (CGCC) and cooperative credits for vocational courses are provided by East Valley Institute of Technology (EVIT). Students must be dually enrolled for the Arizona community college or the Arizona public university system to accept the credits towards a degree. CUSD Transportation Department provides routes between Perry, EVIT, and CGCC with after school hours transportation intended for students participating in activities.

Extracurricular activities

Athletics 

Perry is an Arizona Interscholastic Association (AIA) member school offering boys and girls sports complying with Title IX. Student athletes can participate in varsity, junior varsity, and freshmen only teams as well as individual athletics in:

 Badminton
 Baseball
 Basketball (Boys)
 Basketball (Girls)
 Cheer
 Cross Country
 Football
 Golf (Boys)
 Golf (Girls)
 Hockey Competitive
 Lacrosse (Girls)
 Pomline
 Soccer (Boys)
 Soccer (Girls)
 Softball
 Swim and Dive
 Tennis (Boys)
 Tennis (Girls)
 Track and field
 Volleyball (Boys)
 Volleyball (Girls)
 Wrestling

Girls Badminton 

The girls badminton team won 4 consecutive Arizona State Championship between 2017-2020. Due to the COVID-19 pandemic, the 2021 the AIA canceled as Arizona schools closed.

Fine Arts Department
The Perry High School theater program is widely recognized as one of Arizona's best. In the fall of 2014, the department was invited to perform their production of The Addams Family at the Arizona Thespians State Conference, where they were also awarded for other achievements. In 2015, their production of The 25th Annual Putnam County Spelling Bee was chosen as Arizona's chapter select at the International Thespian Festival. In 2017, their spring production of Mary Poppins was also awarded Best Overall Production at the ASU Gammage High School Musical Theatre Awards. Additionally, they were named A.I.A. state champions of the Central Region for seven consecutive years until 2019, when the Arizona Thespian Society discontinued its competitive ranking system.

Perry’s marching band is well-known in Arizona for repeatedly earning high scores at competitions around the state.

Perry High also has a choir who in 2011 sang at Carnegie Hall in New York City, as well as an Orchestra who played there in 2015, earning first place at the event.

Campus

Library
When Hamilton High School and Basha High School were built, the city of Chandler incorporated branch libraries into those sites. Perry is within Gilbert town limits, and so the Chandler Unified School District worked to incorporate a Maricopa County Library District branch into the site. The Perry Branch Library opened in June 2007. It was the first public library located in a high school in Gilbert, and the first public library in the nation to not use the Dewey Decimal System, opting instead for a bookstore-like system that places non-fiction books into categories based on subject. This change brought national attention to the library and provoked debate about the effectiveness of the Dewey Decimal System.

The county library is the second to be integrated inside a high school, after the library at Boulder Creek High School in Anthem, which also features a Maricopa County regional library

Notable alumni 

 James Rallison - Animator - content created on YouTube
Brock Purdy - NFL - 49ers quarterback
Markus Howard - NBA/NBAG - player with the Denver Nuggets and Marquette Golden Eagles
Jalen Williams - NBA - played with the University of Santa Clara and was drafted 12th overall in the NBA Draft by the Oklahoma City Thunder

References

External links 
Official Perry High School homepage
Maricopa County Library District Perry Branch Gilbert

Education in Chandler, Arizona
Education in Gilbert, Arizona
Educational institutions established in 2007
Public high schools in Arizona
Public libraries in Arizona
Schools in Maricopa County, Arizona
Buildings and structures in Chandler, Arizona
2007 establishments in Arizona